Thornely is a surname, and may refer to:

 Arnold Thornely (1870–1953), English architect 
 Charles Thornely (born 1958), English cricketer, poet and writer
 Dominic Thornely (born 1978), Australian cricketer 
 Michael Thornely (born 1987), English cricketer
 Ronald Thornely (1889–1984), English World War I flying ace